James Storm (born August 12, 1943) is an American actor who is best known for his role as Gerard Stiles on the 1960s horror soap opera Dark Shadows.

Storm's first television appearance was as the second Dr. Larry Wolek on One Life to Live for which replaced actor, Paul Tulley, a role Storm played from 1968 to 1969. His brother, Michael, followed him in the role. In the storyline, Jim's Larry Wolek was badly burned in a fire and underwent plastic surgery, and Michael's Larry Wolek was revealed when the bandages were removed. This new plot device would prove so successful that many other shows, including Dynasty (and One Life to Live itself in later years), would use it when recasting key characters.

He next portrayed Gerard Stiles on Dark Shadows from 1970 to 1971, appearing in 79 episodes. He played a different character with the same name in the 1971 spinoff film Night of Dark Shadows. 

His next soap role was on The Secret Storm starting in 1971, and then he moved on to The Doctors (1979), Texas (1980-1981), The Young and the Restless as Neil Fenmore (1983-1986), Capitol (1986), The Bold and the Beautiful as Bill Spencer (1987-1994) and Sunset Beach (1997-1998), with some returns to B&B in the 2000s.

In 2010, it was announced that he would be appearing in the audio mini-series Kingdom of the Dead.

Family
Storm is the elder cousin of playwright John Steppling. He is married to Dr. Valerie J. Pronio-Storm.

References

External links
 
 

American male soap opera actors
American male television actors
Living people
1943 births
Place of birth missing (living people)